Alessio Sundas (born 2 December 1971) is an Italian sports agent and founder of Top Players Scouting, creator of Oracle Genius Soccer algorithm that rates the value of football players from 1 to 1000 through certified KPI data of players. He is also a media entrepreneur, author and television personality.  In 2003, Sundas established Gutenberg Publishing House, that publishes Millennium Magazine and Cinque Terre Magazine. He established Miami Magic FC Academy in Miami, United States to training Americans European style of soccer and negotiates transfer of players to Major League Soccer, MLS.  In February 2021, he negotiated the transfer of Brazilian player Alexandre Pato from São Paulo to Orlando City in Major League Soccer.

Early life and education 
Alessio Sundas was born in Italy. Sundas early education was at Linguistic High School after which he proceeded to CEPLAT where he earned a degree in Physiotherapy specializing in sports with a licence to operate ligaments. Sundas later obtained a degree in Marketing and Communication in Milan.

Career 
Sundas had a stint in television programs starting at  the age of 19 when he first appeared in a program, Maurizio Costanzo Show. Later, Sundas appeared in Marta Flavi show on Canale 5 as a guest and Uomini e Donne TV show along with Maria De Filippi on same Canale 5.

American Group Sports Management 
Expanding his career to the United States in 2019, Sundas established American Group Sports Management one of the largest agencies in America that values Boca Raton players. The agency broker exchanges of players between European leagues and the Major League Soccer (MLS) and other lower leagues in the US. In January 2021, the company made its first major deal in the MLS with the transfer of Brazilian player Alenxdre  Pato to Orlando City FC.

Agent career 
In 2000, Sundas took a career in football and became Fifa agent and player manager. In 2015, Sundas was registered as a member of Italian sports agent and managed Dei Giovani. Later he extended his managerial services to women's football managing the transfer of a Brazilian national player, Andressa Alves da Silva from FC Barcelona to AS Roma and Ferjani Sassi who played in the Russia 2018 FIFA World Cup for Tunisia national team.

After discussion with Real Madrid's Sports Director, Secura to bring Lionel Messi to Italy to play in serie A club, Napoli was unsuccessful, Sundas initiated discussions with foreign clubs  for the transfer of goalkeeper Riccardo Piscitelli. In 2019, Sundas became the manager of the Italian-Tunisian goalkeeper, Aladin Ayoub who was playing in Serie B championship with Virtus Entella. In 2016, Sundas got Mattia Vaccaro registered with Napoli, where he received technical, tactical and athletic training until 2018/2019 season, when Sundas again moved Vaccaro to Ascoli for two years contract and was later proposed to CT Mancini. Sundas invented “Volarisation” (Enhancement) of players using technologies such VEO and GPS camera to record and analyze players’ strength and weakness which are then used to correct and improve players’ performance.  In August 2021, he launched Alessio Sundas Method App which allows players to create personalized technical sheet compiled through the processing of three videos by Match Analysis and Analysis Data experts.  ASM algorithm gives a value range from one to 1,000 on every player performance. The app is connected to technical and sports institutes for easy access to player's real performance data.

Select transfer deals

References 

Sports managers
Italian sports agents
1971 births
Living people
Sports agents
Association football agents
American sports agents